Emma Amos (born 18 August 1964 in Newcastle-under-Lyme, Staffordshire) is an English actress. She played Yvonne Sparrow in the last three series and 2016 special of time travel sitcom Goodnight Sweetheart alongside Nicholas Lyndhurst, replacing original actress Michelle Holmes who held the role from 1993-96. In 1992, she played Sherbet Gravel in Philip Ridley's controversial stage play The Fastest Clock in the Universe.

Life
Emma Amos trained at the Royal College of Music from 1982 to 1989, and in 1991 she landed a part in the British film Buddy's Song. Designed as a vehicle for the rising pop-singer Chesney Hawkes, the film also starred Roger Daltrey of rock band the Who as Terry, Buddy's dad. Amos was cast as Dawn, Terry's girlfriend, but only featured in a few brief scenes. Amos's first television role was playing 'Phoebe' the talking phone in the children's series Wizadora. She starred in 8 episodes in 1991 for Oxford Press before the series was picked up by ITV and Phoebe was re-introduced as a model phone. She started in an episode of long-running sit-com Men Behaving Badly, playing the part of Mandy, the annoying girlfriend of Tony's brother, in the episode "People Behaving Irritatingly".

Following a variety of supporting-part roles, Amos eventually landed a starring role alongside Nicholas Lyndhurst in the time-travel sitcom Goodnight Sweetheart. Replacing Michelle Holmes midway through the show's 6 series run, Emma took on the role of time-travelling bigamist Gary Sparrow's 1990s wife, Yvonne. It was in the final three series that the character developed considerably, Emma's performance focusing on Yvonne's increasing success as a high-powered business woman. The show's creators also made the character a far sexier proposition than previously. She was often dressed in smart business suits with short skirts or seen exercising in tight-fitting lycra. In one episode, "The 'Ouses in Between", Amos took on the additional role of Marie Lloyd, a music hall singer in Victorian times who meets Jack the Ripper, when her husband's time-travelling takes him further back in time than usual.

Since then, Amos has appeared in a range of British television series, including Casualty, A Touch of Frost, Peak Practice, Midsomer Murders, The Bill, Heartbeat, My Family and Doctors. She has also been seen in the feature films Vera Drake and Bridget Jones's Diary. Amos played Julie Davies in The Last Detective.

In January 2009, she appeared in a Churchill Insurance TV commercial. In 2016 it was announced that Amos, as well as her daughter Esme Coy, would appear in a one-off special return of Goodnight Sweetheart.

On 26 April 2017, it was announced that Amos would be appearing in the Chichester Festival Theatre production of Sweet Bird of Youth by Tennessee Williams from 2–24 June 2017.

Amos is married to the actor Jonathan Coy.

Filmography

Film

Television

Theatre

References

External links

1964 births
Living people
English television actresses
People from Newcastle-under-Lyme
Alumni of the Royal College of Music